A Hard Day's Night may refer to:

A Hard Day's Night (film), a film starring The Beatles
A Hard Day's Night (album), an album that serves as the soundtrack to the film
"A Hard Day's Night" (song), a song from the film and on the album
Hard Days Night Hotel, a hotel in Liverpool named after the Beatles' film
A Hard Day's Night (EP), an EP by the rock group Sugarcult, featuring a cover of The Beatles' song
"A Hard Day's Night" (Grey's Anatomy), the first episode of the TV medical drama series Grey's Anatomy